Sanbal Baji or Fatima Khanum, was one of the consorts of the Persian ruler Fath-Ali Shah Qajar (r. 1797-1834). 

She was very popular among the public because of her way of forwarding petitions from supplicants to him.

References

 بامداد، مهدی (۱۳۴۷)، شرح حال رجال ایران در قرن ۱۲ و ۱۳ و ۱۴ هجری (جلد ۶)، تهران: زوار

Qajar royal consorts
19th-century Iranian women